Baruțu T. Arghezi (28 December 1925, Bucharest – 26 August 2010, Arad) was a Romanian prose writer, essayist and publicist, the son of Tudor Arghezi, brother of Mitzura Arghezi. He was a member of the Writers' Union of Romania and the author of over twenty volumes and numerous literary and political studies published in the country and abroad. The main subject of his writings is the village, villagers, art and authentic peasant culture.

References

1925 births
2010 deaths
Romanian opinion journalists
20th-century Romanian writers
21st-century Romanian writers
People from Bucharest